Shabnam Ramaswamy is a social worker and interior designer in India. She is best known for her NGO Street Survivors India (SSI) situated in Katna, Murshidabad in  West Bengal, which operates education and economic development programs for local villages.

Early life
Shabnam was born in the village of Katna, Kolkata. She studied at La Martinière Calcutta.

She joined Mira Nair’s Salaam Balak, where she rescued runaways at Delhi station. A senior journalist, Jugnu Ramaswamy, approached her with the intention of making a film on her work. After making the film, the two married.

Career

Street Survivors India
Street Survivors India was formed in 1990 in Delhi to provide learning opportunities for working street children. It operated Jagriti school, which was also a kitchen and night shelter. It was demolished in a government "clean-up drive" to reclaim commercial space.

SSI launched the Jagriti Gramin Library project with assistance from the Rajiv Gandhi Foundation. This program runs eleven libraries in villages near Katna. Each library was envisaged as a nodal point and support centre for children from an additional ten surrounding villages. For a minimal fee, students can read or borrow books related to their school subjects, as well as access works of reference and fiction.

Recognition
2013: Courage Award from Women Have Wings.

References

Social workers
Living people
People from Murshidabad district
Social workers from West Bengal
Women educators from West Bengal
Educators from West Bengal
Year of birth missing (living people)